The Wing Python IDE family of integrated development environments (IDEs) from Wingware was created specifically for the Python programming language, with support for editing, testing, debugging, inspecting/browsing, and error checking Python code.

There are three products in this product line, each focused on different types of users:

 Wing Pro – a full-featured commercial version, for professional programmers
 Wing Personal – a free version that omits some features, for students and hobbyists
 Wing 101 – a very simplified free version, for teaching beginning programmers

Wing Pro provides local and remote debugging, editing (with multiple key bindings, auto-completion, and auto-editing), multiselection, source browser and code navigation, code refactoring, error checking, auto-reformatting, unit testing, version control, project management, Python environment and package management, search abilities, fine-grained customization, support for Docker and LXC containers, assistance for working with third party frameworks and tools (such as Django, Flask, Matplotlib, Pandas, Blender, Maya, Unreal Engine, PyQt, wxPython, and others) extension through Python scripting, and comprehensive documentation.

Wing Personal and Wing 101 omit some of these features. All three versions of Wing run on Windows, Mac OS X and Linux.

Free licenses for Wing Pro are available on application for some educational uses and for unpaid open-source software developers.

Debugger
The debugger can be used to track down and fix bugs, and also as a way to write new code interactively in the live runtime state for which the code is being designed.  The level of the debugging support depends on the version used.

Wing 101 supports:
 Debug code launched from the IDE (as a file or module with 'python -m')
 Interactive debugging from (and within) the integrated Python Shell
 Exception and traceback reporting
 View stack, locals/globals, and return values
 Data frame and array viewer
 Integrated Debug I/O tool with configurable text encoding
 Optional native console I/O
 Steps over importlib frames

Wing Personal adds:
 Multi-threaded debugging
 Debug code launched outside of the IDE, including code running under a web framework or embedded instance of Python
 Debug value tooltips
 Alter debug data values
 Define named entry points and debug launch configurations

Wing Pro adds:
 Interactive Debug Probe command line for inspecting the current debug frame, with auto-completion, syntax highlighting, goto-definition, call tips, and documentation links
 Multi-process and automatic child process debugging
 Launch remote debug processes from the IDE
 Conditional and ignore-counted breakpoints
 Enable/disable breakpoints
 Move debug program counter
 Debug unit tests
 How-Tos and extra features for Django, Flask, Jupyter, matplotlib, web2py, Plone, Zope, Docker, AWS, Vagrant, Raspberry Pi, Windows Subsystem for Linux, Blender, Unreal Engine, Nuke, and many others
 Press Shift-Space to view the value of all symbols in the editor
 Recursive debugging of code invoked in the context of another debug stack frame
 Convenient Restart Debugging tool
 Track values by reference
 Evaluate expressions
 Breakpoint manager
 Debug process attach/detach
 Inspect sys.modules
 Mark a range of code in the editor for quick reevaluation in Python Shell or Debug Probe

Code intelligence
The code intelligence features speed up editing, facilitate navigation through code, and inspects code for errors. These features rely both on static analysis of Python code found in the project and on the Python Path, and on runtime analysis of code whenever the debugger is active or the code is active in the integrated Python Shell.

The features available depend on product level:

Wing 101 provides:
 Auto-completer offers completions in Python code and in the integrated Python shell (this feature is disabled by default in Wing 101 but can be enabled in preferences)
 Source index menus in each editor provide a handy index into source code
 Goto-definition
 Auto-indent
 PEP8, Black, and YAPF reformatting
 Syntax and indentation error indicators
 Convert indents and end-of-line characters on paste
 Understands PEP 484 and 526 type hinting

Wing Personal adds:
 Find Symbol: keyboard-driven goto-definition within current file or any project file
 Auto-completion in non-Python files
 Indentation analysis and conversion
 Source Assistant: provides context-appropriate call signature and documentation with rendering of PEP287 docstrings
 Class browser for single files or whole project

Wing Pro adds:
 Code Warnings tool
 Pylint, pep8 checker, mypy, and flake8 integrations
 Module browser
 Source Assistant includes standard library documentation links
 Find all points of use of a symbol, filtering out different but like-named symbols
 Find symbol by name, in current file or all project files
 Refactoring: rename or move a symbol and update points of use, extract a range of code to a new function or method, or introduce a variable

Version control
Version control integration is available only in Wing Pro.  It supports the following tools:
 git
 Mercurial
 Perforce
 Subversion
 CVS

Unit testing
Unit Testing support is available only in Wing Pro.  It supports running and debugging unit tests written for the unittest, pytest, doctest, nose, and Django testing frameworks.

Remote development
Wing Pro also supports secure development on remote hosts, virtual machines, or containers hosted by Docker, Docker Compose, or LXC/LXD. Code on the remote system may be edited, debugged, tested, and managed from the IDE, as for locally stored files.  Remote development also supports externally launched debugging.

Other features
Other features present in all the product levels include:
 Editor emulates vim, emacs, Visual Studio, Eclipse, XCode, matlab, and Brief
 Syntax highlighting for most programming languages, including Python, Django (web framework) templates, CoffeeScript, HTML/XML, CSS, JavaScript, C/C++, and about 70 others
 Integrated Python shell with auto-completion, syntax highlighting
 Search within the current file
 Configurable color palettes and user interface layout
 Extensive documentation, How-Tos, and tutorial
 German, French, and Russian UI localization

Wing Personal adds:
 Multi-select to simultaneously editing multiple parts of a file
 Define custom key bindings
 Create projects for different development tasks
 Quickly open project files by name fragment
 Add, delete, rename, and move files in the project
 Create new virtualenv or Anaconda env projects
 Project-wide and multi-file search
 Regex and wildcard search
 Search documentation

Wing Pro adds:

 Goto-definition, call tips, and documentation links in the integrated Python shell
 Python environment creation with virtualenv, pipenv, conda, and Docker
 Python package management with pip, pipenv, and conda
 File add, delete, rename, and move operations track to the active revision control systems
 Set and traverse bookmarks
 Code snippets with recursive inline data entry
 Perspectives for naming custom user interface layouts
 Execute external commands in integrated OS Commands tool
 Extend the IDE's functionality with Python scripts

History
First public version of Wing was released on 2000-09-07, as 1.0 beta, only for Linux.

First stable version was v1.0 for Linux, on 2000-12-01.

Corporate name change: Archaeopteryx Software Inc is now doing business as Wingware: March 29, 2004.

Wing version 4.x and earlier were based on GTK2 and the OS X version required X11.  Wing 5 changed to Qt4 via PySide and no longer uses X11 on OS X.  Wing 6 moved to Qt5 with PyQt5.

The history of all releases to date can be found at https://wingware.com/news

See also
 List of integrated development environments for Python

References

External links
 

Integrated development environments
Python (programming language) development tools